Exaeretia qinghaiana is a moth in the family Depressariidae. It was described by S.X. Wang and Z. Zheng in 1996. It is found in China (Qinghai).

References

Moths described in 1996
Exaeretia
Moths of Asia